Väinö Matti Juho (V.M.J.) Viljanen (24 November 1874, Tuusula - 2 September 1946) was a Finnish engineer, business executive and politician. He was a member of the Parliament of Finland from 1924 to 1927, representing the National Progressive Party.

References

1874 births
1946 deaths
People from Tuusula
People from Uusimaa Province (Grand Duchy of Finland)
National Progressive Party (Finland) politicians
Members of the Parliament of Finland (1924–27)